Glyn Chamberlain (born 27 May 1958) is an English former football manager whose last managerial position was for one game as caretaker manager at Macclesfield Town. He was appointed as recruitment consultant by Crewe Alexandra in April 2022.

Chamberlain played professionally at Burnley, Chesterfield, and Halifax Town He later played non-League football at Kettering Town, Buxton, Hyde United, Macclesfield Town, Gainsborough Trinity, and Droylsden

As a manager, he managed Newcastle Town and Congleton Town Alongside his managerial work at Congleton Town he worked as a scout at Fulham In 2001, he became full-time scout at Fulham, and in 2005 he became chief scout at Crewe Alexandra He left Crewe in 2009 to become scout at Burton Albion

In 2010, he was named Gary Simpson's new assistant manager at Macclesfield Town On 30 April 2012 he was named caretaker manager at Macclesfield Town following the departure of Brian Horton. However, Chamberlain and the Silkmen parted company shortly after the end of the 2011–12 season.

Following his departure from Maccelsfield Chamberlain returned to scouting and worked for Doncaster Rovers and Burnley before being appointed as chief scout of Cardiff City in March 2017. He was appointed as recruitment consultant by Crewe Alexandra in April 2022.

References

1958 births
Footballers from Chesterfield
Living people
English footballers
Association football defenders
English Football League players
Burnley F.C. players
Chesterfield F.C. players
Kettering Town F.C. players
Macclesfield Town F.C. players
Macclesfield Town F.C. managers
English Football League managers
Fulham F.C. non-playing staff
Newcastle Town F.C. managers
Congleton Town F.C. managers
Gainsborough Trinity F.C. players
Droylsden F.C. players
Halifax Town A.F.C. players
Buxton F.C. players
Hyde United F.C. players
Crewe Alexandra F.C. non-playing staff
Doncaster Rovers F.C. non-playing staff
Cardiff City F.C. non-playing staff
Burnley F.C. non-playing staff
English football managers